In ice hockey, the captain is the player designated by a team as the only person authorized to speak with the game officials regarding rule interpretations when the captain is on the ice. At most levels of play each team must designate one captain and a number of alternate captains (usually two or three) who speak to the officials when the captain is on the bench. Captains wear a "C" on their sweaters, while alternate captains wear an "A".

Officially captains have no other responsibility or authority, although they may, depending on the league or individual team, have various informal duties, such as participation in pre-game ceremonies or other events outside the game. As with most team sports that designate captains, the captain is usually a well-respected player and a de facto team leader.

Responsibilities and importance

According to International Ice Hockey Federation (IIHF) and National Hockey League (NHL) rules, the only player allowed to speak with referees about rule interpretations is the captain, or, if the captain is not on the ice, an alternate captain.

Although the rules do not specify any other distinction between the captain and his teammates, the captain has numerous responsibilities to the team, particularly in North American professional hockey. The captain is a dressing room leader, and also represents the players' concerns to management.

The captain is often considered the primary representative of the team to the public, and sometimes is responsible for organizing the team's social functions and performing ceremonial on-ice functions, such as award presentations or ceremonial faceoffs.

Selection
NHL teams need not designate the same player as captain from game to game, though most teams do. For instance, in the 1985–86, when Boston Bruins captain Terry O'Reilly retired, Ray Bourque and Rick Middleton were named as co-captains of the team. Middleton wore the "C" during home games and Bourque for road games during the season's first half, and the two switched for the second half. This arrangement continued until Middleton retired in 1988 and Bourque became the sole captain. Some teams name two (such as the Buffalo Sabres during the 2005–06 and 2006–07 NHL seasons) or three (such as the Vancouver Canucks during the 1990–91 season) captains for a season. Some teams rotate captains rather than keep one for an extended period of time (the Minnesota Wild rotated captaincy every one or two months until the 2009–10 season, when Mikko Koivu was named the first permanent captain since the franchise's inception). During each NHL game, however, only one player can officially be designated as captain.

Captains are usually veteran players, though on occasion younger players are chosen. The selection is often seen as an important moment for a team, and one that can affect the team's (and newly appointed captain's) performance. Captains are selected by different means: in some instances, teams have held votes among their players to choose a team captain, while on other occasions, the choice was made by team management. Captains are often chosen due to their seniority in the game and years of service with their current club. However, franchise players—current or emerging stars—have also been named captains. Though not required, many captains have previously served as alternate captains of their team. Some selections or removals of NHL captaincies have been controversial, more so than the other North American professional sports leagues. For instance, in Canada men's national ice hockey team, then-General Manager Bobby Clarke selected Eric Lindros for the 1998 Winter Olympics, considered somewhat controversial as Lindros was chosen over longer-tenured NHL captains such as Steve Yzerman, Ray Bourque and Wayne Gretzky, Clarke was also general manager of the Philadelphia Flyers whom Lindros played for professionally. In 2000, when the relationship between Clarke and Lindros deteriorated during contentious contract negotiations and the team's handling of Lindros' injuries, the team captaincy was issued to Eric Desjardins. Tampa Bay Lightning head coach John Tortorella stripped the captaincy from Vincent Lecavalier for failing to meet on-ice performance expectations. In 1980, Darryl Sittler angrily resigned the captaincy by cutting off the "C" from his Toronto Maple Leafs jersey with scissors, in protest of Harold Ballard's trade of his best friend Lanny McDonald, Ballard likened Sittler's actions to flag burning.

The rules of the IIHF, NHL and Hockey Canada do not permit goaltenders to be designated as on-ice captains, due to the logistical challenge of having the goaltender relay rules discussions between referees and coaches and then return to the crease. The NHL introduced a rule prohibiting the goaltender from being a captain following the 1947–48 season (see § Goaltender captains below). In the NCAA, there is no position-based restriction on the team captain.

Alternate captains

Teams may designate alternate captains often erroneously called "assistant captains". Alternate captains wear the letter "A" on their jerseys in the same manner that team captains wear the "C".

In the NHL, teams may appoint a captain and up to two alternate captains, or they may appoint three alternate captains and thus no captain. A team commonly has three alternate captains when the team has not selected a captain, or when the serving captain is injured and misses a game. In the National Hockey League, it is common for a team to have three alternate captains if no one is assigned captain, the current captain is absent, or a goaltender is named as the captain. International and USA amateur rules do not allow this; they stipulate that "each team must appoint a captain and not more than two alternate captains" In the Ontario Hockey League (OHL), Quebec Major Junior Hockey League (QMJHL), Western Hockey League (WHL) and minor leagues under the jurisdiction of Hockey Canada, teams are allowed to have a captain with up to three alternate captains.
If the team chooses to not appoint a captain, they are not permitted to appoint a fourth alternate captain. When the captain is off the ice or unavailable for the game, any alternate captain on the ice is responsible for fulfilling the captain's official role as liaison to the referees.

NHL teams may choose alternate captains from game to game or appoint regular alternate captains for the season. In North America, alternate captains perform many of the same leadership and team building roles as the captain. In the 1969–70 season, the Boston Bruins had three alternate captains (Johnny Bucyk, Phil Esposito and Ed Westfall) instead of a captain sporting the "C". However, as Bucyk was the most senior of the alternate captains, he was first one to be presented the Stanley Cup when the team won the championship in 1970 and 1972.

In the NCAA, a team can designate a single alternate captain to assume the role of captain, should the captain be unavailable due to injury or penalty.

Designation on uniform

The letter "C" or "A" is attached to the jersey of the team's captain and alternate captains (commonly sewn at higher levels of play, though removable insignia exist so the "C" or "A" designation can be easily changed). The designation is traditionally placed on the left side of the sweater, though the IIHF, NHL and NCAA rules specify only that it must be in a "conspicuous location on the front" of the player's sweater. Four teams in the NHL have sweaters where the positioning of the crest on the front leaves insufficient space on the left for the letter: the Detroit Red Wings, who place the letter on the right side of the home and road jerseys since the 2007–08 season, while the Arizona Coyotes, Carolina Hurricanes, and New Jersey Devils all have alternate jerseys where the captain's patch is on the right.

In the World Hockey Association's final season of 1978-79, Paul Shmyr, the captain of the Edmonton Oilers, wore a "K" (for kapitan) on his sweater instead of a "C", as a salute to both his personal, and the city of Edmonton's, Ukrainian heritage.

NHL captains

Records
Steve Yzerman served as the captain of the Detroit Red Wings for 20 years/19 seasons (1986–87 to 2005–06) and 1,303 games during that time, the longest term in the history of the NHL by both years and games. The Boston Bruins' Ray Bourque was previously the longest-tenured captain in NHL history from 1985–86 to 1999–00, being co-captain for the first three seasons. Daniel Alfredsson holds the record as the longest-serving European captain serving for 14 years/13 seasons (1999–00 to 2012–13) as captain of the Ottawa Senators. Alfredsson's record was tied by Zdeno Chara, who served as the captain of the Boston Bruins also for 14 seasons between 2006-07 and 2019-20. Brian Bellows was the youngest captain in NHL history, serving as the interim captain of the Minnesota North Stars from January to May 1984, during Craig Hartsburg's absence from the lineup, due to injury. The youngest permanent NHL captain in history is Connor McDavid, announced as captain by the Edmonton Oilers on October 5, 2016, at the age of 19 years and 266 days.

 Player is still active as captain of their team.

Table Notes:

† An exact date for Brian Bellows' interim captaincy has not yet been determined. The North Stars captain, Craig Hartsburg, was injured on January 3, 1984, and Bellows became interim captain shortly thereafter in January 1984.

** Stan Smyl resigned as Canucks captain at the end of the 1989-90 season. Trevor Linden, Dan Quinn, and Doug Lidster were named "Tri-Captain" for the 1990-91 season. Dan Quinn would be traded to the St. Louis Blues at the 1991 trade deadline. Trevor Linden would retain captaincy and became permanent captain for the start of the 1991-92 season.  Exact dates for announcements and first game wearing the "C" in "Tri-Captaincy" rotation could not be determined. Date listed is Linden's first game of the 1991-92 regular season as permanent captain.

Stanley Cup Finals
Jean Beliveau is the only one to have captained his team to win five Stanley Cup Championships, doing so with the Montreal Canadiens between 1961 and 1971. The following captains all won four, three of them in consecutive years: Maurice Richard (1957-58-59-60) with the Canadiens, George Armstrong with the Toronto Maple Leafs, Yvan Cournoyer (1976-77-78-79) with the Canadiens, Denis Potvin (1980-81-82-83) with the New York Islanders and Wayne Gretzky with the Edmonton Oilers. Charlie Gardiner was the first NHL captain born in Europe to lead his team to a Stanley Cup title (1934). Derian Hatcher became the first American-born captain to win the Stanley Cup in 1999. Daniel Alfredsson was the first European-born and trained captain to lead an NHL team to the Stanley Cup Final (2007), while Nicklas Lidstrom was the first captain born and trained in Europe to lead an NHL team to a Stanley Cup title (2008). Mark Messier was the first NHL player to win the Stanley Cup as captain of two different teams: the Edmonton Oilers in 1990 and the New York Rangers in 1994. Sidney Crosby became the youngest captain in the NHL to win the Stanley Cup in 2009 at 21 years 10 months. The youngest captain to lead his team to the Stanley Cup in the history of the trophy is Mike Grant of the 1895 Montreal Victorias, who was 21 years and 2 months at the time.

Minority captains
Dirk Graham became the first NHL captain of African descent when he was named captain of the Chicago Blackhawks in March 1989. Jarome Iginla, who became captain of the Calgary Flames in 2003, has been cited by ESPN as the first black captain in NHL history.
Kyle Okposo was named the captain of the Buffalo Sabres for the 2022-2023 season.

Goaltender captains
In NHL history, there have been six goaltenders who served as official team captains:

 John Ross Roach (Toronto St. Patricks): 1924–25 season
 George Hainsworth (Montreal Canadiens): 1932–33 season
 Roy Worters (New York Americans): 1932–33 season
 Alex Connell (Ottawa Senators): 1932–33 season
 Charlie Gardiner (Chicago Black Hawks): 1933–34 season
 Bill Durnan (Montreal Canadiens): latter half of 1947–48 season

The Hockey Hall of Fame displays a picture of Toronto Maple Leafs goaltender Turk Broda wearing the captain's "C," but he never actually served in that capacity, and he was actually wearing Toronto team Captain Syl Apps' sweater.

Prior to the 1948–49 season, the NHL made a change to the rules, prohibiting goaltenders from being captains or alternate captains. This was in response to complaints from opponents of the Montreal Canadiens, who complained that Durnan left his crease to argue with the referee at strategic points during games, resulting in unscheduled timeouts. This rule is sometimes referred to as the "Durnan Rule."

Although the Canucks appointed goaltender Roberto Luongo as team captain for the 2008–09 and 2009–10 seasons, since he could not be his team's official captain during games, Willie Mitchell was the on-ice captain, serving as liaison to the officials, and Henrik Sedin and Mattias Ohlund performed ceremonial aspects of the position such as pre-game faceoffs.

Japanese goaltender Yutaka Fukufuji is currently designated an alternate captain of an Asia League Ice Hockey team, the Nikkō Ice Bucks.

See also
Captain (sports)
List of current NHL captains and alternate captains
List of current AHL captains
List of current SHL captains and alternate captains
List of Team Canada captains

References
 

Notes

Ice hockey people
Ice hockey terminology
Leadership positions in sports
 
Sports captains